Vàm Cống Bridge, is a road bridge over the Hậu River(also known as Bassac), a distributary of the Mekong River, in the city of Long Xuyên in Vietnam.

Description

Planning
Before 2010, traffic across the two sides of Bassac river was dependent on travel by wharf and ferry. The opening of the Cần Thơ Bridge in 2010 helped to connect the city of Can Tho with Vinh Long province, allowing for further economic development in the Mekong Delta.  However, other high traffic areas of the Mekong River remained dependent on wharfs and ferries, including the Vàm Cống ferry that had been in operation since 1925.

In 2011, national transportation agencies in Vietnam proposed a transportation plan for the Mekong River Delta region, part of which included the construction of the Vàm Cống bridge to help integrate the greater highway system.

Construction

On September 10, 2013, a groundbreaking ceremony took place in Đồng Tháp province. The Consulting Team for the project included Dasan Consultants Co. Ltd., Kunhwa Consulting and Engineering Co. Ltd, and Pyunghwa Engineering Consultants Ltd (South Korean), with the main construction contractors consisting of a joint venture between GS Engineering & Construction and Hanshin Engineering & Construction Co., Ltd (South Korea). Cienco 1 would serve as a subcontractor. The initial investment of 5.6 billion VND came from the Korea International Cooperation Agency and Vietnam  During construction, there was conflict around the management of the project, resulting in delays.

Opening
All six lanes of the bridges were open to the public in May 2019. The project took five years to complete and is reported to have cost 5.7 billion VND  (approximately 240 billion KRW, US$202 million).  The Asian Development Bank is working on an infrastructure project that will construct additional road to connect into the bridge.

References

Road bridges in Vietnam
Cable-stayed bridges in Vietnam
Bridges completed in 2019
Bassac River
Buildings and structures in Cần Thơ
South Korea–Vietnam relations